Tennis competitions at the 2019 Pan American Games in Lima, Peru are scheduled to be held from July 29 to August 4. The competitions will take place at the Club Lawn Tennis de La Exposición.

A total of 80 athletes (48 men and 32 women) are scheduled to compete in five events: singles and doubles for each gender and a mixed doubles event.

The top two in each individual event will qualify for the 2020 Summer Olympics, if ranked in the top 300 in the world by June 8, 2020, and if their country has not passed the maximum quota.

Competition schedule

The following is the competition schedule for the tennis competitions:

Medal table
The following is the medal standings as of 3 August 2019.

Medalists

Participating nations
A total of 22 countries had qualified athletes.

Qualification

A total of 80 tennis players will qualify (48 men and 32 women). The host nation automatically qualifies the maximum team size of six athletes (three per gender). Four wild cards for men and three for women will also be awarded, with the rest of the spots being awarded using the ATP ranking and WTA ranking as of June 11, 2019. If spaces are still left over, the ITF rankings will be used.

See also
Tennis at the 2020 Summer Olympics

References

External links
Results book

Tennis at the 2019 Pan American Games
Events at the 2019 Pan American Games
Pan American Games
2019